These were the Jesuit Reductions in the Gran Chaco region in 1768 when the Jesuits were expelled.

San José
San Esteban
Pilar
Nuestra Señoar de Buen Concilio
San Juan Bautista
Rosario de las Salinas
San Ignacio de Ledesma
San Fernando
San Jerónimo
San Javier
San Pedro
Concepcíon
Belén
Rosario
San Juan Nepomuceno

See also
List of churches of the Jesuit Missions of the Chiquitos

References

Chaco
Chaco
Jesuit Missions of Chaco